Texas A&M International University Soccer Complex (also known as Dustdevil Field and TAMIU Soccer Complex) was built in 2006 and renovated in 2007. The soccer complex is located in Laredo, Texas in the Texas A&M International University campus. The complex has two soccer fields with a seating capacity of 4,000 on one of them. The Dustdevil Field is the home stadium to the 2007 champion team Laredo Heat member of the National Premier Soccer League and the TAMIU Dustdevils women and men's soccer teams member of the Heartland Conference, NCAA Division II.

Exhibition games
Exhibition soccer games hosted by the Texas A&M International University Soccer Complex:
United States U-20 vs Mexico U-20
3:0 U.S. win
attendance: 4,000
July 11, 2008
Mexico U-20 vs Laredo Heat
3:0 Mexico win
attendance: 4,000
July 9, 2008

External links

Laredo Heat Soccer Club official website
Texas A&M International University Athletics

References

Sports venues in Laredo, Texas
Soccer venues in Texas
College soccer venues in the United States
Sports venues completed in 2006
Texas A&M International University
2006 establishments in Texas